Meixihu Subdistrict is a subdistrict of Yuelu District in Changsha, Hunan, China. It was formed from a part of Tianding Township in April 2007. As of 2017, the subdistrict has two villages and six communities under its jurisdiction. Its seat is Jiashun Community. The subdistrict is the home and the core zone of Xiangjiang New Area. 

Meixihu is the key area of the pilot zone development in the west of Xiang river.

Meixihu, which means "Meixi Lake", is in Xiangjiang new district, Changsha, Hunan province, between the second and third ring roads. Meixi Lake belongs to the Peach Blossom Ridge scenic area of Yuelu mountain. The tiger-shaped mountain is like a tiger at the foot of Yuelu peak. The dragon king harbor river and a tributary flow ahead.

History
On April 29, 2007, the subdistrict of Meixihu was formed from the five villages of Lianluo, Xuehu, Zhongtang, Tianding and Qitian, along with Yangming Shanzhuang Community of Tianding Township. The subdistrict was named after Meixi Lake, located in the middle part of its territory.

At the establishment of Meixihu Subdistrict in April 2007, it had five villages and Yangming Shanzhuang Community under its jurisdiction. The Runlong Community was approved to form in December 2014, the subdistrict had five villages and two communities in 2015. in April 2016, the three villages of Qilong, Tianding and Xuehu were amalgamated to Runlong Community, the subdistrict had two villages and two communities under its jurisdiction. In December 2016, four new communities of Jinmao, Meiyuan, Jiashun and Qilong were approved to establish and formally formed in March 2017, the subdistrict of Meixihu has two villages and six communities under its jurisdiction after 2017.

Landscape

Meixihu music fountain 
The Changsha Meixihu music fountain is one of the large music fountains in China and also the longest music fountain in Asia. In February 2013, the music fountain of Meixihu in Changsha was put into use. Meixihu music fountain is located on the water surface between Meixihu International New Town Festival Island and the Culture and Art Center, directly opposite Jinmao Mansions. It is 460 meters long and 30 meters high. It runs through an arc of four circular groups, with a total of 200 3D sprinkler heads, four large lasers and 1000 LED lights.

Changsha Meixihu International Culture and Arts Center 

The Changsha Meixihu International Culture and Arts Center is located in  Changsha, with a total investment of 2.8 billion yuan, a total land area of 100,000 square meters, and a total construction area of 120,000 square meters, including 48,000 square meters of the grand theater and 45,000 square meters of the art museum two main functions. The grand theatre consists of 1,800 main performance halls and 500 multi-functional small theatres. The museum consists of nine exhibition halls with an area of 10,000 square meters. It is built to accommodate large operas, dance dramas, symphonies and other performances.

The international culture and art center is the largest, the most complete, the national leading, the international first-class international culture and art center in Hunan province, filling the gap of the city and the province's high-end culture and art platform.

Qi-fu avenue 
Qi-fu avenue is located in the Huahu Road of Meixi Lake International New Town, adjacent to the Peach Blossom Ridge scenic spot in the south, and Liuti in the north. It was completed at the end of 2012. It has a length of 400 meters, a height of 4.8 meters and a span of 18 meters. It is divided into four parts, all of which are steel frame structures. At present is the annual Meixi Lake international light festival and Lantern Festival, Meixi Lake flower art exhibition main attractions. In the light festival of 2013, it was decorated with lanterns, fish, umbrellas, wind chimes and other shaped lamps at the top of the four corridors, and accompanied by festive music. It became a tourist attraction during the light festival. It is also used a filming location for TV programs, films and TV dramas.

Eco-city of Meixihu

Introduced the program 
Relying on Meixihu, Changsha city government will vigorously develop high-end services such as research and development, finance, business, exhibition and tourism. The industrial development of the whole city insists on high-end development and nurtures and strengthens "two-oriented" industrial clusters. The development of national innovation-oriented science and technology parks is promoted in high-tech zones, forming high-end industrial clusters. Meixihu new city will develop the new city service industry by relying on the high-tech industries around the city (electronic information, advanced manufacturing, new materials, new energy, energy conservation, environmental protection, bio-pharmaceutical, advanced manufacturing, creative design, etc.), human resources (Central South University, Hunan University, Changsha University of science and technology, etc.) and other resources.

Low-carbon environmental goals 
The main energy consumption links in the buildings around Meixihu, such as heat and cold sources, transmission and distribution systems, lighting, office equipment and hot water consumption, are measured separately, and the property is recorded regularly. Itemized measurement shall comply with the technical guidelines for the design and installation of itemized measurement for buildings with energy consumption monitoring system for state organs and large public buildings. For public buildings with centralized air conditioning system, cold and heat metering devices should be set up in different floors, indoor areas, users or rooms. Cold and heat metering devices shall be installed in each public building and its cold and heat station.

New planning 
Meixihu new city adheres to the principle of sustainable development and carries out the planning and design of Mwixihu new city according to the following principles: reduce the carbon emission caused by internal transportation through compact and easy walking hybrid society; provide adequate employment opportunities through self-sufficient urban centres; create a zero-carbon and low-carbon transport hierarchy through green transport systems; reduce carbon emissions through the use of passive design; through the integration of green space and water system, provide a comfortable environment and reduce the urban heat island effect.

Tour route

 Parent-child route: Ginkgo Park — Language of the Wind Square — Festival Island
 Lovers route: central green axis — Peach Blossom Ridge scenic spot — Language of the Wind Square — Festival Island
 Half day (morning) route: Festival Island — Language of the Wind Square — Meiling Park — Ginkgo Park
 Half day (afternoon) route: Peach Blossom Ridge scenic area — central green axis — Festival Island — Meixihu music fountain
 One day route: central green axis — Peach Blossom Ridge scenic spot — Ginkgo Park — Meiling Park — Language of the Wind Square — Meixihu music fountain

Subdivisions
In 2017 the subdistrict of Meixihu had two villages and six communities under its jurisdiction.

2 villages
 Lianluo Village
 Zhongtang Village

6 communities
 Jiashun Community
 Jinmao Community
 Meiyuan Community
 Qilong Community
 Runlong Community
 Yangming Shanzhuang Community

References

External links
 Official Website （Chinese / 中文）

Yuelu District
Subdistricts of Changsha